Managed Satellite Distribution (formerly Headend in the Sky/HITS) is Comcast's satellite multiplex service that provides cable channels to cable television operations.

At a traditional cable television headend, multitudes of satellite dishes and antennas are used to grab the cable stations from dozens of communication satellites. In contrast, Managed Satellite Distribution combines cable stations into multiplex signals on just a few satellites; cable television companies can then pull in hundreds of channels at the local headend with relatively little equipment; the HITS feed effectively replaces the more complex traditional headend operations.

Managed Satellite Distribution was founded in 1994 and its namesake product is commonly recognized as the pioneer of digital television in the United States. Managed Satellite Distribution was launched by TCI before their later 1999 purchase by the old AT&T, then merged with the smaller Comcast in 2002 as part their purchase of AT&T Broadband (formerly TCI). The Managed Satellite Distribution headquarters in Centennial, Colorado, formerly known as the National Digital Television Center, is now called the Comcast Media Center.

As of 2010, Managed Satellite Distribution offers 6 standard-definition multiplexes on SES Americom's SES-1, 12 standard-definition multiplexes and 8 HD multiplexes on AMC-18, 1 standard-definition multiplex on AMC-10, and 1 standard definition multiplex on Intelsat's Galaxy 17. As of 2010, HITS delivers more than 280 digitally compressed video and audio television programming signals to more than 2000 cable operation sites across the US.

See also
Cable television in the United States

References

External links
 Comcast Technology Solutions — official website

Comcast subsidiaries
Littleton, Colorado
Satellite television
Cable television in the United States
Mass media companies established in 1994
1999 mergers and acquisitions
2002 mergers and acquisitions